The Call is an album by jazz saxophonist Charles Lloyd recorded in July 1993 by Lloyd with Bobo Stenson, Anders Jormin, and Billy Hart.

Reception
The Allmusic review by David R. Adler awarded the album 3 stars stating "While the record documents plenty of stirring musicianship, Lloyd the composer seems to be running low on fresh ideas and distinctive melodies".

Track listing
All compositions by Charles Lloyd.

 "Nocturne" - 5:23
 "Song" - 12:44
 "Dwija" - 6:46  
 "Glimpse" - 8:33  
 "Imke" - 3:55  
 "Amarma" - 7:18  
 "Figure in Blue, Memories of Duke" - 9:25
 "The Blessing" - 10:54
 "Brother on the Rooftop" - 11:58

Personnel
Charles Lloyd - tenor saxophone
Bobo Stenson - piano
Anders Jormin - double bass
Billy Hart - drums

References

1993 albums
ECM Records albums
Charles Lloyd (jazz musician) albums
Albums produced by Manfred Eicher